The 2017 Copa Libertadores Finals were the two-legged final that decided the winner of the 2017 Copa Libertadores de América, the 58th edition of the Copa Libertadores de América, South America's premier international club football tournament organized by CONMEBOL.

The finals were contested in two-legged home-and-away format between Brazilian team Grêmio and Argentinian team Lanús. The first leg was hosted by Grêmio at Arena do Grêmio in Porto Alegre on 22 November 2017, while the second leg was hosted by Lanús at Estadio Ciudad de Lanús in Lanús on 29 November 2017.  

Starting this season, the final matches was held again in November, after 35 years last played. 

The winners of the 2017 Copa Libertadores qualified as the CONMEBOL representative at the 2017 FIFA Club World Cup in the United Arab Emirates, and also earned the right to play against the winners of the 2017 Copa Sudamericana in the 2018 Recopa Sudamericana. They also automatically qualified for the 2018 Copa Libertadores group stage.

Grêmio defeated Lanús 3–1 on aggregate to win their third Copa Libertadores title.

Teams

Venues

Road to the final

Note: In all scores below, the score of the home team is given first.

Format

The finals were played on a home-and-away two-legged basis, with the higher-seeded team hosting the second leg. If tied on aggregate, the away goals rule would not be used, and 30 minutes of extra time would be played. If still tied after extra time, the penalty shoot-out would be used to determine the winner. If extra time was played, a fourth substitution would be allowed.

Matches

First leg
Cícero scored the only goal in the 82nd minute with a left foot shot from six yards out after Jael headed the ball on to him inside the penalty box.

Second leg
Diego Braghieri (Lanús) and Walter Kannemann (Grêmio) missed the second leg after picking up a yellow card in the first leg.

Grêmio scored twice before half-time. Fernandinho stole the ball in Gremio's half, ran freely toward Andrada's goal and hammered it home from the edge of the box in the 26th minute. In the end of the first half, Luan dribbled through two Lanus defenders and lobbied the ball gently into the net. In the second half, José Sand scored from the penalty spot in the 71st minute.

Notes

See also
2017 Copa Sudamericana Finals
2018 Recopa Sudamericana

References

External links
  
 Copa Libertadores 2017, CONMEBOL.com 

Finals
2017
Club Atlético Lanús matches
Grêmio Foot-Ball Porto Alegrense matches
2017 in Argentine football
2017 in Brazilian football
November 2017 sports events in South America